The Wairaurāhiri River is a river in southern Fiordland, New Zealand, draining Lake Hauroko into the sea. Many boats have got into trouble along its length, as the river flows quite quickly with grade-3 rapids, so the main boats that use the river are commercial jetboats. There is a  drop from the source at Lake Hauroko to the mouth, which empties into Foveaux Strait.

There is an active stoat and rat trapping program set up along the length of the river and maintained by locals. Possums were plentiful in the area as early as 1900.

References

External links

Rivers of Fiordland